Chinnakada or Chinnakkada is considered as the heart of the city of Kollam in Kerala, India. Chinnakada is a busy junction where 5 city roads and one National highway interconnect at a traffic roundabout. The city's symbolic clock tower is located in Chinnakada. To reduce the traffic congestion in Chinnakada, Kollam Municipal Corporation constructed an underpass near to clock tower. Marine Products Export Development Authority (MPEDA)'s Kollam sub-regional office is situated at Chinnakada.

Toponymy
The name Chinnakada may be derived from China-Kada, which means China bazaar. Chinese coins and other artefacts in enormous quantities were found near the Kollam port, proving Kollam was a significant Chinese trading hub. Another explanation is that due to the presence of a large number of Tamil people in Kollam, they named the area Chinnakada, which means "small market" in the Tamil language. This derivation fits with the toponomy of Valiakada adjacent to Chinnakada, which means "big market" in Malayalam.

Other areas in Kollam ending with the word kada in the name
Kadappakada
Payikkada
Pullikada
Chamakada
Valiyakada

History

The ancient city of Kollam, then known as Quilon, was an important center for trade with the Chinese.

Chinnakada Underpass 

The Chinnakada Underpass is a public road infrastructure project for the city of Kollam as part of the Kerala Sustainable Urban Development Project supported by the Asian Development Bank (ADB) to ease traffic congestion at Chinnakada, the city CBD of Kollam. The presence of an existing Railway over bridge and three close intersections with heavy traffic limits the option for traffic management measures including junction improvement. That caused the authorities to think about this underpass at Chinnakada. Chinnakada is a complex junction where roads from Thiruvananthapuram, Alappuzha, Downtown, Sengottai, Ashramam, Kollam Beach and the City bus stand road meets.

Underpass has been thrown open to the public by the end of May 2015.

Gallery

See also 
 Kollam
 Kollam Junction railway station
 Kollam district
 Kollam Port
 Kollam Beach
 Kollam Pooram
 Andamukkam City Bus Stand
 Kadappakada
 Asramam Maidan

References 

Neighbourhoods in Kollam
Shopping districts and streets in India